Jalan Sawah, Federal Route 399, is a federal road in Johor state, Malaysia.

The Kilometre Zero is located at the junction of the Federal Route 1 at Kulai town centre (see also Kulaijaya-NSE Highway).

At most sections, the Federal Route 399 was built under the JKR R5 road standard, with a speed limit of 90 km/h.

List of junctions

References

Malaysian Federal Roads